Joseph "JT" Curtis is an American musician, producer and actor based in New York City. He was an original cast member of the Broadway musical, Let it Be as the lead guitarist. He has played guitar with Shooter Jennings, Oscar Brashear, Rosie Flores, Becky and the Blu-Tones, and Starlight Orchestras. On YouTube he is known for his History of Rock series. He is the son of author and producer Jay Curtis.

JT Curtis grew up in Los Angeles where he produced production music for CBS, ABC, FOX, The Super Bowl and for the NCAA's March Madness. In 2008, Curtis produced the 7th Sun album From the Beginning, featuring notable musicians Adam Kury, Stephen Quadros, and Michael Russeck. The album was released independently through CD Baby and was nominated "Best Independent CD" by Southbay Music Awards and lauded by critics. In 2009, he performed for Jimmy Carter's 85th Birthday with the award winning St. Genevieve High School chorale.

Before relocating to New York in 2010, Curtis produced his "One Man Band" single "Make it to the Bridge." A YouTube video for the song features Curtis playing all instruments (guitar, bass, drums, keyboards and vocals). In New York, he formed the band, Mad Mongoose, and produced his next single "Shake it Off" in December 2013. The single was independently released through TuneCore.

In the beginning of 2015, Curtis produced his debut solo album "One Last Stand" which was also released independently. A song from the album, "Home (Last Stand)" was featured on Reverbnation. A music video for the song also appeared on YouTube. In 2019, JT Curtis produced a progressive rock piece entitled Elements sampling poetry from his late father Jay Curtis. Recent releases include Never Let the Bastards Grind You Down and You and Only You.

From July to September 2013, JT Curtis performed in Let it Be on Broadway. The show's rendition of "While My Guitar Gently Weeps", which Curtis sang and performed the guitar solo, was praised by critics as the highlight of the play. He also toured with the production since 2015 in North America, New Zealand, and Asia.

In 2014, JT Curtis started an online music education show on YouTube called History of Rock, initially directed by Jay Curtis (who also plays the "Annoying Hippie Bum") before his passing in 2018 where JT assumed direction duties. Each episode focuses on one decade at a time, highlighting songs and stories of the time between scripted comedic segments. Other videos produced by Curtis focus on specific rock artists, bands or albums.

In 2021, Curtis produced a podcast musical called Atomic Rod Reunion featuring original music.

References

Sources 
 JT Curtis Website Bio
 PHOTO EXCLUSIVE: "Strawberry Fields Forever..."
 Playbill Vault Info

External links 
  (archive)
  (archive)
 

Living people
Year of birth missing (living people)
American musicians
American actors
American producers
American podcasters
American YouTubers